Kongō is the Japanese word for vajra. It may refer to:

 Mount Kongō, a mountain in Osaka Prefecture, Japan
Kongō Range
 Mount Kongō (Sado), a mountain in Niigata Prefecture, Japan
 , the name of several Japanese ships
 Kongō (Noh school), a school of Noh acting 
 Kongō Masahiro (1948–2014), a Japanese sumo wrestler
 Kongō Station, a railway station in Ōsakasayama, Osaka Prefecture, Japan

See also

 Congo (disambiguation), including Kongo
 King Kong (disambiguation), called 金剛 in Chinese
 金剛山 (disambiguation)